XHNU-FM is a radio station on 94.5 FM in Acapulco, Guerrero, Mexico. It is owned by Grupo Audiorama and carries a pop format known as Súper 94.5 FM.

History
XHNU received its concession on January 4, 1977. It was owned by Elba Yolanda Brust Carmona and originally operated on 98.5 MHz (now home to XHMAR-FM). At some point before 1994, XHNU moved to 94.5. Brust Carmona sold to Radiorama in 2006.

References

Radio stations in Guerrero
Radio stations established in 1977